Orodruin is an American doom metal band from Rochester, New York, who play traditional doom as part of the style's early-2000s revival, playing alongside bands like Reverend Bizarre, While Heaven Wept, and Penance. Their sophomore release Ruins of Eternity came out on Cruz Del Sur Records on October 25, 2019.

Orodruin began in 1998. Bridging the love for Tolkien with doom metal with influences like Saint Vitus, Candlemass, Cathedral, Trouble and Black Sabbath. In its primal stages John Gallo (then singer/guitarist), cousin Nick Tydelski (guitar) and best friend Mike Puleo (guitar) recorded an early demo in late 1998/1999. It was recorded with engineer Sebastian Marino (Overkill) at Audio Images and hired drummer Rob Mount (Ramrod, Lou Graham Band). In 2001 they found full time drummer Mike Waske and Mike Puleo switched to bass/vocals. Their sound cultivated with new material more in line to traditional doom metal. The first full length Epicurean Mass was released on Mark Hegedus' psycheDOOMelic label out of Vienna, Austria, in spring 2003.

In 2003, they embarked on their first U.S. tour in support of Epicurean Mass as part of the Doomination Tour alongside The Prophecy (England) and Mourning Beloveth (Ireland).

In 2004, they released a split 12" on Chris Barnes' Hellride Music Label and put out an EP on PsycheDOOMelic called Claw Tower and other Tales of Terror and went on a European tour with Penance in spring of that year. With both bands playing Doom Shall Rise 2 in Göppingen, Germany.

Mike Waske left in 2018 so Mike Puleo filled in on drums for their sophomore album "Ruins of Eternity". In 2019 Kevin Latchaw (Argus) lended his drumming for the Hammer of Doom XIV festival in Würzburg, Germany, and a few local shows in Rochester, New York. In 2022, they recruited local Rochester drummer Randy Rowe (Haishen) to officially join the band.

Members of Orodruin are closely associated with other contemporary doom acts such as The Gates of Slumber, Revelation, Iron Man, Blood Ceremony, and Argus.

Members 
Mike Puleo – bass, vocals, studio drums
Nicholas Tydelski – guitar
John Gallo – guitar

Former members 
Mike Waske – drums

Discography

Albums 
 Epicurean Mass (2003, PsycheDOOMelic Records)
 Ruins of Eternity (2019)

EPs 
 Claw Tower and Other Tales of Terror (compilation, 2004, PsycheDOOMelic Records)
 In Doom (2012, independent)

Splits 
 Orodruin/Reverend Bizarre (2004, Hellride Music)

External links 
 Official website (archived)
 Orodruin at doom-metal.com

American doom metal musical groups
Heavy metal musical groups from New York (state)
American musical trios
Musical groups established in 1998